American rapper BlocBoy JB has released one studio album, ten mixtapes, one EP, and multiple singles.

Studio albums

Compilation albums

Mixtapes

Collaborative mixtapes

Extended plays

Singles

As lead artist

As featured artist

Promotional singles

Guest appearances

Music videos

As lead artist

As featured artist

Notes

References 

Discographies of American artists
Hip hop discographies